The women's long jump at the 2018 European Athletics Championships took place at the Olympic Stadium on 9 and 11 August.

Records

Schedule

Results

Qualification

Qualification: 6.67 m (Q) or best 12 performers (q)

Final

References

Long jump W
Long jump at the European Athletics Championships
Euro